This is a list of the results of the 1894 general election in Western Australia, listed by electoral district. Information about informal votes (and thus about voter turnout) is unavailable.

Results by electoral district

Albany

Ashburton

Beverley

Bunbury

De Grey

East Kimberley

East Perth

Fremantle

Gascoyne

Geraldton

Greenough

Irwin

Moore

Murchison

Murray

Nannine

Nelson

Northam

North Fremantle

Perth

Pilbara

Plantagenet

Roebourne

South Fremantle

Sussex

Swan

Toodyay

Wellington

West Kimberley

West Perth

Williams

Yilgarn

York

See also
 Members of the Western Australian Legislative Assembly, 1890–1894
 Members of the Western Australian Legislative Assembly, 1894–1897

References
 

Results of Western Australian elections
1894 elections in Australia